In mathematics, the Drazin inverse, named after Michael P. Drazin, is a kind of generalized inverse of a matrix.

Let A be a square matrix. The index of A is the least nonnegative integer k such that rank(Ak+1) = rank(Ak). The  Drazin inverse of A is the unique matrix AD that satisfies

It's not a generalized inverse in the classical sense, since  in general.

 If A is invertible with inverse , then .
 Drazin inversion is invariant under conjugation.
 The Drazin inverse of a matrix of index 0 or 1 is called the group inverse or  {1,2,5}-inverse and denoted A#.  The group inverse can be defined, equivalently, by the properties AA#A = A, A#AA# = A#, and AA# = A#A.
 A projection matrix P, defined as a matrix such that P2 = P, has index 1 (or 0) and has Drazin inverse PD = P.
 If A is a nilpotent matrix (for example a shift matrix), then 

The hyper-power sequence is 
 for convergence notice that 
For  or any regular  with  chosen such that  the sequence tends to its Drazin inverse,

Jordan normal form and Jordan-Chevalley decomposition 

As the definition of the Drazin inverse is invariant under matrix conjugations, writing , where J is in Jordan normal form, implies that . The Drazin inverse is then the operation that maps invertible Jordan blocks to their inverses, and nilpotent Jordan blocks to zero.

See also
 Constrained generalized inverse
 Inverse element
 Moore–Penrose inverse
 Jordan normal form
 Generalized eigenvector

References

External links 
Drazin inverse on Planet Math
Group inverse on Planet Math

Matrices

de:Pseudoinverse#Ausgewählte weitere Versionen von verallgemeinerten Inversen